Confluaria furcifera is an endoparasitic tapeworm which infects grebes in the Holarctic. It is common in the horned grebe in Lake Mývatn, Iceland and it has been reported from the great crested grebe (Podiceps cristatus australis) in Lake Wanaka, New Zealand.

References 

Eucestoda
Parasites of birds
Animals described in 1869